Forest "Spot" Geyer (December 9, 1892 – February 7, 1932) was an American football fullback. He played college football at the University of Oklahoma and attended South Haven High School in South Haven, Kansas. Geyer replaced Claude Reeds his sophomore year in 1913 when Reeds sat out a game due to an eligibility dispute. Geyer and the Oklahoma Sooners finished with a 9-1-1 record in 1914 and a 10-0 record in 1915. He was given the nickname "Spot" for his precise passing ability. He was elected to the College Football Hall of Fame in 1973.

References

1892 births
1932 deaths
People from Sumner County, Kansas
Players of American football from Kansas
American football fullbacks
Oklahoma Sooners football players
College Football Hall of Fame inductees